Terence or Terry Henry may refer to:

Terry Henry (curler) in 1986 Labatt Brier
Terence Henry, actor in Scene of the Crime (1996 film)
Terry Henry (DOJ), see Gouled Hassan Dourad

See also

 Thierry Henry, French footballer